The Ecological Society of America (ESA) is a professional organization of ecological scientists. Based in the United States and founded in 1915, ESA publications include peer-reviewed journals, newsletters, fact sheets, and teaching resources. It holds an annual meeting at different locations in the USA and Canada. In addition to its publications and annual meeting, ESA is engaged in public policy, science, education and diversity issues.

ESA's 9,000 members are researchers, educators, natural resource managers, and students in over 90 countries. Members work on a wide range of topics, from agroecology to marine diversity and explore the relationships between organisms and their past, present, and future environments. The Society has over 20 topical sections and seven regional chapters.

History

The first discussions on the formation of the Society took place in 1914 in the lobby of the Hotel Walton in Philadelphia, Pennsylvania, at a meeting of animal and plant ecologists organized by Henry Chandler Cowles. On December 28, 1915, in Columbus, Ohio, at the meeting of the American Association for the Advancement of Science, a group of about 50 people voted to form the Ecological Society of America, adopted a constitution, and set the next meeting. Dr. Victor E. Shelford of the University of Illinois served as the first president.

The Society was founded to unify the science of ecology, stimulate research in all aspects of the discipline, encourage communication among ecologists, and promote the responsible application of ecological data and principles to the solution of environmental problems. The Society has grown to 10,000 members worldwide. 

In the 1940s, the Society decided that it should focus on research and not pursue an activist or political focus on ecological preservation, leading Shelford to found what became The Nature Conservancy.

Divisions

The Public Affairs Office works to engage in environmental and science policy, share ecological science with the media and the public, and to inform the ecological community about opportunities to participate in public policy or media interactions. ESA's Rapid Response Team experts play a key role in these activities, serving as a resource for ESA, policymakers, and the media.

The Science Programs Office promotes the continued development of ecological science and its integration into decision-making and education, linking the ecological research and management communities.

The Education and Diversity Programs Office works to increase diversity within ecology-related professions, to engage the public in a dialogue on ecological research and issues, and to improve the quality of ecology education at all levels.

ESA Journals – The Society publishes the scientific, peer-reviewed journals Ecology, Ecological Monographs, Ecological Applications, Frontiers in Ecology and the Environment, and most recently added, Ecosphere. Madhusudan Katti is the Executive Editor of the quarterly Bulletin of the Ecological Society of America. Among others, research featured in ESA's journals has included articles on white-nose syndrome in bats, marine protected areas, migration systems of New World birds, the indirect ecological effects between parasitoid wasps and rhizobacteria, and the range expansion of cougars.

Online communications

Blog

EcoTone is a blog produced by the Ecological Society of America. The blog showcases ecology and ecologists, focusing on ecological science in the news and its use in policy and education. EcoTone welcomes guest submissions and suggestions of timely, relevant news of importance to the broad ecological community.

Podcasts

Beyond the Frontier - features interviews with the authors of selected articles appearing in recent print issues of the ESA journal Frontiers in Ecology and the Environment. Beyond the Frontier also aspires to make the subject matter accessible and interesting to listeners from a variety of scientific disciplines, and to non-specialists as well. Listeners are encouraged to continue the discussion online, using the “add comment” functionality underneath each podcast to post their own thoughts and ideas.

The Ecologist Goes to Washington - features the stories and reflections of scientists who have engaged their local, state, or federal governments in addressing the broader implications of their research.

Field Talk - features the field experiences of ecologists including interviews exploring the work of those who have published in the Society's journals.

Membership

Membership of this Society consists of persons and institutions interested in ecology and in the promotion of ecological research. The following classes of members are recognized: Regular members, Student members, Life members, Emeritus members, and Institutional members.

Officers and elections

The officers are the President, the Vice President for Science, the Vice President for Public Affairs, the Vice President for Finance, the Vice President for Education and Human Resources, and the Secretary.
The President serves consecutive one-year terms as President-elect, President, and Past President. A member may hold the office of President for only one term, in addition to such time as may be served filling the office following the death or resignation of a President.

The Vice Presidents and the Secretary serve three-year terms and are eligible for reelection for up to one additional term. The terms of the Vice Presidents and the Secretary shall be overlapping so that no more than two of these officers shall normally be elected in any given year.

The officers and other positions filled by Society elections are selected by electronic ballot. The official terms of the officers commence with the close of the Annual Meeting and continue until their successors assume office. Only Regular, Student, and Life members are eligible to hold office in the Society. No employee or member of the immediate family of an employee of the Society may be nominated for or hold elected office within the Society.

Governing Board

The Governing Board consists of the President, the President-elect, the Past President, the four Vice Presidents, the Secretary, and three Members-at-Large. 
The three Members-at-Large are elected by the voting membership for two-year terms, with generally no more than two being elected in any one year.

The President chairs the Governing Board and the Council and presides at their meetings. In the President's absence, the President-elect presides; if the President-elect is also not present, the Past President presides, and if the Past President is also not present, the Governing Board shall elect a Chair from among those members of the Governing Board who are present.

See also 

 Conservation biology
 Conservation movement
 Ecology
 Ecology movement
 Environmental movement
 Environmental protection
 Scientific societies

References

External links
 

Professional associations based in the United States
Biology societies
Ecology organizations
Scientific societies based in the United States
Organizations established in 1915